This is a list of physical and mathematical constants named after people.
Eponymous constants and their influence on scientific citations have been discussed in the literature.

 Apéry's constant – Roger Apéry
 Archimedes' constant (pi) – Archimedes
 Avogadro constant – Amedeo Avogadro
 Balmer's constant – Johann Jakob Balmer
 Belphegor's prime – Belphegor (demon)
 Bohr magneton – Niels Bohr
 Bohr radius – Niels Bohr
 Boltzmann constant – Ludwig Boltzmann
 Brun's constant – Viggo Brun
 Cabibbo angle – Nicola Cabibbo
 Chaitin's constant – Gregory Chaitin
 Champernowne constant – D. G. Champernowne
 Chandrasekhar limit – Subrahmanyan Chandrasekhar
 Copeland–Erdős constant – Paul Erdős and Peter Borwein
 Coulomb constant (electric force constant, electrostatic constant) – Charles-Augustin de Coulomb
 Eddington number – Arthur Stanley Eddington
 Dunbar's number – Robin Dunbar
 Embree–Trefethen constant
 Erdős–Borwein constant
 Euler–Mascheroni constant – Leonhard Euler and Lorenzo Mascheroni
 Euler's number – Leonhard Euler
 Faraday constant – Michael Faraday
 Feigenbaum constants – Mitchell Feigenbaum
 Fermi coupling constant – Enrico Fermi
 Gauss's constant – Carl Friedrich Gauss
 Graham's number – Ronald Graham
 Hartree energy – Douglas Hartree
 Hubble constant – Edwin Hubble
 Josephson constant – Brian David Josephson
 Kaprekar's constant – D. R. Kaprekar
 Kerr constant – John Kerr
 Khinchin's constant – Aleksandr Khinchin
 Landau–Ramanujan constant – Edmund Landau and Srinivasa Ramanujan
 Legendre's constant (one, 1) – Adrien-Marie Legendre
 Loschmidt constant – Johann Josef Loschmidt
 Ludolphsche Zahl – Ludolph van Ceulen
 Mean of Phidias (golden ratio, phi) – Phidias
 Meissel–Mertens constant
 Moser's number
 Newtonian constant of gravitation (gravitational constant) – Sir Isaac Newton
 Planck constant – Max Planck
 Reduced Planck constant or Dirac constant (-bar) – Max Planck, Paul Dirac
 Ramanujan–Soldner constant – Srinivasa Ramanujan and Johann Georg von Soldner
 Richardson constant – Owen Willans Richardson
 Rayo's number – Agustin Rayo
 Rydberg constant – Johannes Rydberg
 Sommerfeld constant – Arnold Sommerfeld
 Sackur–Tetrode constant – Otto Sackur and Hugo Tetrode
 Sierpiński's constant – Wacław Sierpiński
 Skewes' number – Stanley Skewes
 Stefan–Boltzmann constant – Jožef Stefan and Ludwig Boltzmann
 Theodorus' constant ( ≅ ±1.732050807568877...) – Theodorus of Cyrene
 Tupper's number – Jeff Tupper
 Viswanath's constant – Divakar Viswanath
 von Klitzing constant – Klaus von Klitzing
 Wien displacement law constant – Wilhelm Wien

See also
List of eponymous laws, for a list of laws named after people
List of scientific laws named after people
List of scientists whose names are used in physical constants

Notes and references 

Constants

Constants named after people